Tia Jones (born September 8, 2000) is an American track and field athlete who competes in hurdling and sprinting events

Jones has been named USA Track & Field's Athlete of the Week after winning the 13-14 girl'’ 100 m and 200 m hurdles and setting national and Junior Olympic records in both events at the USATF National Junior Olympic Track & Field Championships on July 28, 2013.

She won the 100-meter hurdles at the 2016 USA Junior Championships in a time of 12.84 seconds, which equaled Aliuska Lopez's world junior record dating from 1987. It was the best ever time set by a 15-year-old athlete.

Personal bests

References

External links
 Tia Jones at OmRiyadat
 

2000 births
Living people
American female hurdlers
African-American female track and field athletes
World Athletics U20 Championships winners
21st-century African-American sportspeople
21st-century African-American women
20th-century African-American sportspeople
20th-century African-American women
20th-century African-American people